Sri Sumangala College, in Panadura, Sri Lanka, was founded on 3 March 1909 at Rankoth Viharaya, in memory of Ven. Weligama Sri Sumangala Thero, who played an important role in Sri Lankan Buddhism. It is one of the oldest schools in the country. It is a national school, controlled by the central government as opposed to the Provincial Council. It is one of the largest Buddhist school in Sri Lanka, with a student population of 4,000 over 13 Grades.

History
In 1911 when this school was registered as an assisted school there were 325 students on roll. The first principal was Thomas E. Gunarathne.

The land for the school was donated by the Rankoth Viharaya while the buildings were constructed out of public funds. The school was managed by a Board of Management and funds for the running of the school were met by philanthropists and the general public.

Due to the rapid expansion of the college the Rankoth Viharaya premises became congested and there was the necessity to re-locate the college. The manager of the Board of Management tried to relocate to Walawa Waththa in 1942, where Sri Sumangala College is presently located. When this failed, the management decided to shift the college to Nalluruwa.

The main hall of the building complex was donated by Leo Fernando; physics, chemistry and biology laboratories were donated by P. C. H. Dias and the main building and the class rooms were built with public donations.

All the classes from grade six upwards were taken to Nalluruwa new buildings on 7 August 1942. Grades 3,4 and 5 were continued at the Rankoth Viharaya premises and it was popularly called town branch of the college. The principal or the head of this section was A. C. Morawaka who served the college until his retirement.

With the transfer of the college to Nalluruwa it became one of the leading educational institutions where laboratory facilities were available for the students to do science subjects in the medium of English
. Advance level students of the Sri Sumangala Girls School used the laboratories in the afternoons to do their practicals. The plot of land between the main college and the play ground was eventually acquired by the Education Department.

In 1961 a large number of schools were taken over by the government and the town branch was registered as a separate school with a principal being appointed by the Education Department. A precedent was created to admit all the children who leave town branch after they passed the grade five test. In 1992 due to inclement weather the retaining wall of the Rankoth Viharaya collapsed damaging the main hall of the town branch. The school had to be kept closed for a few months. The Old Boys Association, parents and well wishers constructed 18 semi-permanent class rooms and the Town Branch was amalgamated to the main college.

On 25 May 1993 the Ccllege was declared a National School by the Ministry of Education.

On 26 December 2004 the tsunami which destroyed the southern and eastern coastal areas damaged part of the semi-permanent buildings of the college. The 2004 Indian Ocean tsunami struck during a school vacation so no injuries were recorded.

All together 182 schools were damaged by the tsunami. Out of these damaged school the government has decided to re-locate 98 schools including Sri Sumangala College. Donor partner JICA granted a Rs. 330 million loan to build a completely new school with all the modern facilities.

It is a coincidence of fate that the Sri Sumangala College has to be moved to a location five decades later that the Board of Management had initially planned on in 1942, before finally settling for the site in Nalluruwa.

Founders
 Ven. Gnanawimalathissa Maha Thero (lived in Panadura Rankoth Viharaya )
 Ven. Walpita Gunarathana Thissabidana Amarapura Maha Nikaye Thero

Houses

The college has four houses, named after kings of Sri Lanka. The four Houses with their associated colours are:

Notable alumni 

Notable former students of Sri Sumangala College (known as Old Sumangalians), include:

Principals
Following is a list of past Principals of the Sri Sumangala College;

Sri Sumangala College Old Boys
The 'Old Boys'are know as those who have left the school and many join the Sri Sumangala College Old Boys Association also known as The Old Boys’ Association of Sri Sumangala College, Panadura (SSCOBA).
The Old Boys Association was established on the 28th of October 1922.

References

External links
 Official Web site of Sri Sumangala College
 Old Boys' Association of Sri Sumangala College – SSCOBA
 Junior Old Boys Association of Sri Sumangala College – SSCJOBA
 ''Old Sumangalians Scout Association'

1909 establishments in Ceylon
Boys' schools in Sri Lanka
Buddhist schools in Sri Lanka
Educational institutions established in 1909
National schools in Sri Lanka
Schools in Panadura